The 1993–94 Scottish League Cup was the 48th staging of the Scotland's second most prestigious football knockout competition.

The competition was won by Rangers, who defeated Hibernian 2–1 in the final at Celtic Park. Ally McCoist scored the winning goal, in his first game after returning from a long term injury (a leg break) suffered earlier in the year while playing for Scotland.

The club record defeats of Albion Rovers (11–1) and Arbroath (9–1) were set earlier in the competition.

First round

Second round
Albion Rovers' 11–1 defeat by Partick Thistle is their club record defeat.

Third round
Arbroath's 9–1 defeat by Celtic is their club record defeat.

Quarter-finals

Semi-finals

Final

Notes

External links
Scottish League Cup 1993/1994

Scottish League Cup seasons
League Cup Final